Seven the Hard Way is the sixth studio album by American singer Pat Benatar, released on October 30, 1985, by Chrysalis Records. It debuted on the US Billboard 200 for the week of December 14 and peaked at number 26, spawning the singles "Invincible", "Sex as a Weapon", and "Le Bel Age". The album has been certified Gold by the Recording Industry Association of America (RIAA).

The Grammy Award-nominated single "Invincible" was produced by Mike Chapman and recorded for the soundtrack of the Matthew Robbins film The Legend of Billie Jean, which, despite underperforming at the box office, became a cult classic to MTV fans in general. The song became commercially successful and was included on the album, despite its musical style differing from Benatar's at that time and more reminiscent of her earlier efforts. Benatar often commented at her concerts before performing the song that it "is from one of the worst movies ever made."

Seven the Hard Way was Benatar's last album to feature bassist Donnie Nossov, who along with drummer Myron Grombacher went on to play with Lita Ford on her breakthrough album, Lita (1988), and on the supporting tour. Grombacher would return to Benatar's band for her follow-up album, Wide Awake in Dreamland, released after the three-year hiatus that followed Seven the Hard Way.

In 1998, BGO Records reissued Seven the Hard Way on CD with Tropico.

Track listing

Personnel 
Credits adapted from the liner notes of Seven the Hard Way.

Band members 
 Pat Benatar – vocals
 Charlie Giordano – keyboards
 Neil Giraldo – guitars
 Donnie Nossov – bass guitar
 Myron Grombacher – drums

Additional musicians 
 Lenny Castro – percussion
 Uptown Horns – horns
 Maxi Anderson, Rose Banks, Tuffy Cummings, Voncielle Faggett, Tommy Funderburk, Jean Johnson, Tom Kelly, Frank Linx, Phyllis St. James, Carmen Twillie and Táta Vega – backing vocals

Technical 
 Neil Giraldo – producer 
 Joe Chiccarelli – associate producer, engineer , mixing 
 Mike Chapman – producer 
 William Wittman – engineer and mixing 
 Dave Hernandez, Daren Klein, George Tutko – additional engineering
 Scott Church, Robert Corti, Marc DeSisto, Paul Ericksen, Steve Himelfarb, Gary Hollis, Richard McKernan, Charlie Paakkari, Brian Scheuble and Samii Taylor – assistant engineers
 Scotty Bem and Jeff Chonis – production coordination
 Michael Frondelli – mixing 
 George Marino – mastering at Sterling Sound (New York City, New York)

Artwork 
 Moshe Brakha – photography
 Larry Vigon – art direction, design

Charts

Weekly charts

Year-end charts

Certifications

References

Bibliography
 

1985 albums
Albums produced by Joe Chiccarelli
Albums produced by Mike Chapman
Chrysalis Records albums
Pat Benatar albums